The 2018 Texas Tech Red Raiders football team represented Texas Tech University in the 2018 NCAA Division I FBS football season. They were led by Kliff Kingsbury in his sixth and final season as the program's 15th head coach. The Red Raiders played their home games on the university's campus in Lubbock, Texas at Jones AT&T Stadium, and competed as members of the Big 12 Conference. They finished the season 5–7 overall, 3–6 in Big 12 play to finish in a 3-way tie for seventh place.

On November 25, head coach Kliff Kingsbury was fired after 6 seasons as head coach, finishing 35–40 overall. 4 days later, the school hired Utah State head coach Matt Wells for the head coaching job.

Previous season
The Red Raiders finished the 2017 season 6–7, 3–6 in Big 12 play to finish in eighth place. The team's conference wins were against Kansas, Baylor, and Texas. The season ended with a 34–38 loss against No. 23 South Florida in the Birmingham Bowl.

2018 NFL Draft

Receiver Keke Coutee was drafted in the 4th round (103rd overall) by the Houston Texans. Receiver Dylan Cantrell was drafted by the Los Angeles Chargers in the 6th round (191st overall).

Coaching changes
Former offensive coordinator/receivers coach Eric Morris was hired as the head coach of the Incarnate Word Cardinals on December 30, 2017. Western Michigan Broncos offensive coordinator/quarterbacks coach Kevin Johns was hired as Texas Tech's new offensive coordinator/receivers coach on January 30, 2018.

Preseason

Award watch lists
Listed in the order that they were released

Big 12 media poll
The Big 12 media poll was released on July 12, 2018 with the Red Raiders predicted to finish in eighth place.

Schedule
Texas Tech announced its 2018 schedule on October 27, 2017. The 2018 schedule will consist of six home games, four away games, and two neutral site games. The Red Raiders began the 2018 season on September 1 against the Ole Miss Rebels (from the SEC) at NRG Stadium in Houston for the AdvoCare Texas Kickoff and ended the season on November 24 against the Baylor Bears at AT&T Stadium in Arlington. The Red Raiders hosted Big 12 foes West Virginia, Kansas, Oklahoma, and Texas and traveled to Oklahoma State, TCU, Iowa State, and Kansas State.

The Red Raiders hosted non-conference foes Houston from the AAC and Lamar from the Southland Conference.

Schedule Source:

Roster

Game summaries

vs. Ole Miss

McLane Carter was named the Red Raiders' starting quarterback for the game. Carter exited the game in the 1st quarter with an ankle injury, with freshman Alan Bowman replacing him. Texas Tech lost its first season opener since the 2002 season, losing to Ole Miss by a score of 27–47.

Lamar

Texas Tech defeated Lamar by a score of 77–0, the Red Raiders' first shutout victory since September 2006. The 77 points are the most points scored by Texas Tech since an 80–21 victory over Sam Houston State in September 2005 and the largest margin of victory since a 79–0 win over Trinity in November 1932.

Houston

Receiver Antoine Wesley broke a school record for most receiving yards in a game with 261 yards. Quarterback Alan Bowman broke a Big 12 record for most passing yards in a game by a freshman with 605 yards.

at Oklahoma State

With the 41–17 victory, the Red Raiders got their first win in Stillwater since 2001, and their first win over the Cowboys since 2008. This is also Texas Tech's first win over a ranked opponent since the 2013 Holiday Bowl.

West Virginia

Starting quarterback Alan Bowman left the game late in the second quarter with an upper-body injury, with Jett Duffey finishing the game. Bowman finished the game 9/20 for 123 yards with one touchdown and an interception. Bowman was taken to a local hospital where it was revealed he had a partially collapsed lung.

at TCU

Jett Duffey started at quarterback for the Red Raiders, the third different starting quarterback in 2018 for Texas Tech.

The Horned Frogs received the opening kickoff, starting at their own 8-yard line following an illegal block penalty. TCU had two more penalties on the drive (both for a false start) and ended the drive with Andrew David punting from his own 22-yard line. Texas Tech made it to the TCU 5-yard line before the drive stalled, settling for a 22-yard field goal from Clayton Hatfield to take a 3–0 lead. On the next drive the Horned Frogs made it to the Texas Tech 8-yard line. The drive ended when a Shawn Robinson pass was intercepted in the endzone by Jordyn Brooks, who returned the interception to the Texas Tech 3-yard line. The Red Raiders only gained two yards following the interception, punting from their own 5-yard line. The Horned Frogs started their drive from the Texas Tech 40, ending the drive on a 20-yard touchdown pass from Shawn Robinson to Jalen Reagor. Texas Tech made it to the TCU 45-yard line, turning the ball over on downs. On the next drive, TCU went for it on 4th down and picked up the 1st down, but Sewo Olonilua fumbled the ball with it being recovered by Tony Jones for Texas Tech. The two teams traded punts on their next possessions. With less than a minute left in the half, a Duffey pass was intercepted by Julius Lewis at the Texas Tech 44-yard line. Following Duffey's interception, Jonathan Song attempted a 47-yard field goal for the Horned Frogs, with the kick going to the left of the goal posts. The Red Raiders took a knee to end the half.

McLane Carter came out at quarterback for Texas Tech to start the second half, playing in his first game since week 1 against Ole Miss. Carter was sacked twice on the first drive of the half, with the Red Raiders having to punt. Duffey returned to the game on Texas Tech's second drive of the half after Carter appeared to be limping off the field following the team's previous drive. Duffey's first drive of the second half ended with a 62-yard touchdown pass to Ja'Deion High. Duffey would also have a 38-yard touchdown run in the 4th quarter to help the Red Raiders edge out the Horned Frogs.

Kansas

Alan Bowman started his first game since suffering a partially collapsed lung three weeks earlier. Bowman left the game midway through the fourth quarter, finishing the game 36/46 for 408 yards and three touchdowns with an interception.

at Iowa State

Oklahoma

Quarterback Alan Bowman left the game at halftime for an unknown reason. It was later revealed that Bowman might have re-aggravated his previous injury where he suffered a partially collapsed lung.

Texas

at Kansas State

The Red Raiders experienced their fourth consecutive loss when traveling to Manhattan. Tech was without starting quarterback Alan Bowman and offensive players Connor Killian and Mason Reed were also out.  Tech ran the ball 26 times for 31 yards and has not had a ball carrier reach 65 yards in the past seven games. Tech's 181 yards of total offense was the lowest output since 2010 against the Texas Longhorns.

Kansas State kicker Blake Lynch had not completed a successful field goal in a game for nearly two months, but managed to match a career-high with four straight and added an extra point. A blocked punt by Kansas State's Brock Monty added to K-State's success with Texas Tech losing by a score of 21-6.

vs. Baylor

Statistics

Scoring
Scores against non-conference opponents

Scores against the Big 12

Scores against all opponents

Offense

Special teams

Weekly awards
 Big 12 Defensive Player of the Week
Dakota Allen (week 8 vs. Kansas)

 Big 12 Special Teams Player of the Week
Dominic Pannazzolo (week 7 vs. TCU)
Clayton Hatfield (week 8 vs. Kansas)

 Big 12 Newcomer of the Week
Alan Bowman (week 3 vs. Houston)

 CBS Sports Freshman of the Week
Alan Bowman (week 3 vs. Houston)

 Earl Campbell Tyler Rose Player of the Week
Alan Bowman (week 3 vs. Houston)

 Manning Award Quarterback of the Week
Alan Bowman (Week 3 vs. Houston)

Rankings

Aftermath

Texas Tech failed to gain bowl eligibility.  Upon the conclusion of the season (after the loss to Baylor), head coach Kliff Kingsbury was fired.  Oregon defensive coordinator Jim Leavitt was reported to have interviewed for the position with Texas Tech's athletics director Kirby Hocut.  The Red Raiders have their next game scheduled for the 2019 season as the program's home opener on August 31, 2019 against Montana State.

Players drafted into the NFL

References

Texas Tech
Texas Tech Red Raiders football seasons
Texas Tech Red Raiders football